Laurie Pace (born 9 February 1966) is a former judoka from Malta, who competed for her native country at three consecutive Summer Olympics, starting in 1992. Her best performance was winning the bronze medal at the 1990 Commonwealth Games in New Zealand.

References

External links
 
 Profile
 

1966 births
Living people
Maltese female judoka
Judoka at the 1992 Summer Olympics
Judoka at the 1996 Summer Olympics
Judoka at the 2000 Summer Olympics
Olympic judoka of Malta
Commonwealth Games bronze medallists for Malta
Judoka at the 1990 Commonwealth Games
Commonwealth Games medallists in judo
Medallists at the 1990 Commonwealth Games